Sestroretsk railway station (stantsiya Sestroretsk) is a railway station in Sestroretsk, Russia. It replaced the old Sestroretsk railway station, which closed in 1924.

External links

Railway stations in Saint Petersburg
Cultural heritage monuments of regional significance in Saint Petersburg